Stanley John Randall (February 1, 1908 – December 13, 1989) was an Ontario businessman and political figure. He represented Don Mills in the Legislative Assembly of Ontario as a Progressive Conservative member.

He was born in Toronto, the son of Annie Letitia and Stephen Randall, educated in Toronto. In 1932, he married Agnes Parker. They had two daughters, Joan and Patricia. Randall began work as a clerk later becoming president of the Easy Washing Machine Company. He was vice-president of the Canadian Manufacturer's Association and chairman of the Ontario Economic Council from 1962 to 1963. He served in the provincial cabinet as Minister of Economics and Development from 1963 to 1968 and Minister of Trade and Development from 1968 to 1971. He retired from politics in 1971.

References 
 Canadian Parliamentary Guide, 1970, GP Normandin

External links 

Stanley Randall, Transcript of Debates, Legislative Assembly of Ontario

1908 births
1989 deaths
Businesspeople from Toronto
Politicians from Toronto
Progressive Conservative Party of Ontario MPPs